Svend Otto Lund (born April 1, 1949) is a former Danish handball player who competed in the 1972 Summer Olympics.

He played his club handball with IF Stadion. In 1972 he was part of the Danish team which finished thirteenth in the Olympic tournament. He played three matches and scored one goal.

References

1949 births
Living people
Danish male handball players
Olympic handball players of Denmark
Handball players at the 1972 Summer Olympics